Ottopasuuna was a Finnish folk music ensemble that mixed their country's traditional music with forms from elsewhere in Europe, played with unconventional instruments.

History 
Ottopasuuna was formed in the early 1990s by Petri Hakala (mandolin, octave mandolin, guitar and fiddle), Kurt Lindblad (flute and bagpipe), Kimmo Pohjonen (accordion), and Kari Reiman (fiddle player who was also a member of the Värttinä group). By 1994, Lindblad had been replaced by Kristiina Ilmonen (whistles, flute and Irish flute) and Janne Lappalainen (bass clarinet and bazouki). Many of the band members were previously part of Finland's Sibelius Academy.

The band is primarily associated with contemporary Finnish folk music and its influences include "the Finno-Ugrian world (...) dance tunes and melodies from Estonia, Ingria, Ostrobothnia (...) and Karelia." Hakala, in particular, has been recognized for his ability to master multiple instruments and described as "one of the finest players around" in folk and rock traditions of Finland. 

In 1991, Ottopasuuna released a critically acclaimed self-titled album through Green Linnet Records. It was the first Finnish folk album to be released internationally.

Discography 

 Ottopasuuna (1991)

Members

 Petri Hakala – guitar, mandocello, mandolin
 Kurt Lindblad – clarinet, flute, whistle
 Kimmo Pohjonen – harmonica, marimba, melodion
 Kari Reiman – fiddle

References

20th-century Finnish musicians
Finnish folk musical groups